Sitniče is a village in the municipality of Novi Pazar based on west side of Novi Pazar. Most population is family Koca., Serbia & Montenegro.

Its population is 778, all of whom are Bosniaks.

Populated places in Raška District